XI. Fliegerkorps (11th Air Corps) was a formation  of the German Luftwaffe in World War II.

References
 XI. Fliegerkorps @ The Luftwaffe, 1933-45

Luftwaffe corps
Military units and formations established in 1941
1941 establishments in Germany
Military units and formations disestablished in 1943